Stuffy or stuffies may refer to:

People
 Hugh Dowding (1882–1970), British Royal Air Force air chief marshal
 Stuffy McInnis (1890–1960), American Major League Baseball first baseman and manager
 Norbert Mueller (1906–1956), Canadian Olympic ice hockey player
Simon Singer (born 1941), American world champion American handball player, and radio and television actor
 Stuffy Stewart (1894–1980), American professional baseball player
 Stephen Gilchrist, British musician

Other uses
 Stuffy McStuffins, the dragon toy in the animated children's television series Doc McStuffins
Stuffed clam, also known as "stuffies", a dish popular in New England, 
Stuffed animal, or stuffy, a toy or collector's item
Stuffy/The Fuses, British alt-rock band

See also
 Stuff (disambiguation)

Lists of people by nickname